Johan Modig (born 30 June 1977) is a Swedish orienteering competitor.

He received a bronze medal in the relay at the 2004 European Orienteering Championships in Roskilde, with Kalle Dalin and Emil Wingstedt.

He is junior world champion in the classic distance from 1997, and received a silver medal in 1996.

Johan has bachelor's degree in mathematics and master's degree in German

References

External links
 

1977 births
Living people
Swedish orienteers
Male orienteers
Foot orienteers
Junior World Orienteering Championships medalists